Eremaea may refer to:

 Eremaea (moth), a genus of moths in the family Lasiocampinae
 Eremaea (plant), a genus of plants from Western Australia

See also
Eremaean province, a botanical region in Western Australia